Buzzco Associates, Inc. is an animation studio that was founded in 1968 (as Perpetual Motion Pictures) by Buzz Potamkin with Candy Kugel and Vincent Cafarelli as co-creative directors and Marilyn Kraemer as executive producer.

History
Early work of the studio included the "I Want My MTV" campaign, and the "Top of the Hour" network ID for MTV. The spots mixed live action, rock stars, music and animation. In 1982, Perpetual Motion Pictures split into Perpetual Animation and Buzzco Productions, Inc., and Vincent Cafarelli and Candy Kugel joined Buzzco. Potamkin left New York in 1984 to form Southern Star Productions in Los Angeles. As part of the continuing partners' agreement in forming Buzzco Associates, Cafarelli, Kugel and Kraemer decided it was important for them to make independent films.

Buzzco continued with production of commercials, titles, insert programming, sales films and segments for such clients as Nickelodeon, Sesame Workshop, MTV, HBO Family and ABC, as well as for educational shows such as Sesame Street, Between the Lions and Square One Television. Commercial clients often come to Buzzco because of its ability to integrate diverse print styles into motion.  They have often worked with humorous illustrator Norm Bendell, designer of commercials for First Morris Bank and the flea-control program CIBA.

Planned Parenthood: Talking About Sex, created and produced for Planned Parenthood won the Grand Prize for an Educational Film at Annecy in 1997.

It's Still Me: A Guide for People with Aphasia & Their Loved Ones is a 17-minute film which explains aphasia and offers ways of communicating without words. It was inspired by Kugel's mother, who was aphasic for twelve years after a massive stroke.

Filmography

Short films
Woman: Who Is Me? (1976)
Inbetweening America (1977)
Confessions of a Starmaker (technical assistance, 1978)
So What If It Rains? (1979) (animation; produced by Manno Productions and Alternate Choice)
Audition (1980)
My Film, My Film, My Film (1983)
A Warm Reception in L.A. (1987)
Animated Self-Portrait (1988)
Snowie and the Seven Dorps 
Fast Food Matador (1991)
We Love It (1992)
The Ballad of Archie Foley (1995)
KnitWits (1997)
KnitWits Revisited (1999)
Life: A New York Ani-Jam (animated contribution, 1999)
Nothing At All (2000)
Piscis (2001)
Juan Bobo's Birthday Party (2002)
Command-Z (2005)
What I Want (music video, 2005)
Right (2007)
dEVOLUTION (2008)
It's Still Me! A Guide For People With Aphasia & Their Loved Ones (2009)
The Last Time (2012)
iHeed: Two Simple Ways To Treat Water (2012)
iHeed: Access to Family Planning is a Human Right (2013)
Blessings of the Season (2013)
My Depression (The Up and Down and Up of It) (2014) (animation)
Vashti (2018)
I, Candy (2018)

Commercials

3M (1970s)
American Academy of Pediatrics (1984, 1988)
American Eagle (1986)
AnMed Health Medical Center (2003)
Beau Rivage Casino (2014)
Bell South (2005)
Big Bear Supermarkets 
Budget Gourmet (1988)
Burger King
CBS (1970s)
CD 101.9 (1990)
Cheerios
Chef Boyardee (1991)
Chex
CIBA
Clearblue Easy (1991)
The Comedy Channel (1990)
Connecticut Academy for Education (1993)
Cosequin (2017)
Dan-E (2011)
Diaperene
Dr. Scholl's (1989)
FirstBank (1980)
First Morris Banks
Fritos (1970s)
GCI (2000)
Hawaiian Punch
HBO (1985)
HBO Family (2001)
K-Lite (1989)
King Features (1982)
KPPL (1982)
McGraw-Hill
MONY (1984)
The Movie Channel (1987)
MTV (1981–1984)
National Science Foundation (1988)
Nickelodeon (1985, 1998)
Nick Jr. (2001)
Ohio Bell (1970s)
Pinnacle (2000)
Prell (1981)
Safelite (2013)
Salem (1981)
See 'n Say (2001)
Skittles (1981)
Southwestern Bell (1993)
Sunkist (1990)
Underalls (1982)
USA Network (1988)
Tyco Toys (1999)
VH-1 (1984–1985)
Visa (2005)
The Wall Street Journal
WESC (1982)
WPIX (1984)
Xerox
Zoombezi Bay (2014)

Commissioned short films
ActMedia
Balloon Museum
CIBA
Hewitt Associates, Inc.
MacMillan Cancer Care
NexView
Xerox

References

External links
Official website
Official Vimeo channel

Television production companies of the United States
American animation studios